Masochist is the first full-length album by deathcore band Elysia. It was originally planned to be released on This City Is Burning Records, but problems forced them to release it independently. Plans for a re-release on the Tribunal Records label also fell through, when the drummer quit right as they were to enter the studio to rerecord it. Thus, the band has always sold it on their own. The album was re-released by Ferret Records in early 2008, though it has once more become unavailable.

Track listing
"Disgust" - 0:17
"Masochist" - 4:54
"Filthy" - 3:45
"Malignancy" - 3:40
"Triumph" - 3:47
"Theocracy" - 3:01
"Xenophobia" - 2:07
"Incinerate" - 4:04
"Sadist" - 3:24
"Swine" - 4:02

Elysia (band) albums
2006 debut albums